Canadian royalty may refer to Canadians; who are members of royal families, Canadian through birth, naturalization, or marriage; or Canadian families that are given the epithet or moniker as Canadian royalty or Canadian royals. Additionally, Canada is a monarchy, so members of the Canadian monarchy are Canadian royalty.

Former monarchies of Canada

Former colonial monarchies of territory now Canada
 French monarchy (House of Bourbon), of the colony of New France
 English monarchy (House of Stuart), prior to the UK's Act of Union, for the colony of Newfoundland 
 Norwegian monarchy, for the Sverdrup Islands.
 Danish monarchy and Norwegian monarchy, for Viking colonies

Indigenous Native royals
Many tribes, bands, nations, have or still have inherited chieftainships, with hereditary chiefs. Canadian colonization of the land required that these First Nations groups have elected band councils and tribal chiefs, which the federal government would recognize and deal with. The colonial expansion also resulted in waves of diseases that have wiped out some hereditary lineages. None of the remaining hereditary chiefs or lineages are recognized as royal by the Canadian governments.

True royalty

Royal house of Canada

Members of the royal house of the monarchy of Canada are the royalty of Canada de jure 
 House of Windsor, ruling dynasty of the Canadian monarchy 

Had Great Britain been invaded by Nazi Germany during World War II, the British (sic Canadian) royal family would have relocated to Canada, during Operation Rocking Horse, into Hatley Castle, Victoria, BC.

It has been suggested that Prince Harry and Duchess of Sussex should be crowned the King and Queen of Canada by an Act of Parliament, through to the loopholes in the Canadian Constitution, due to their residency in Canada.

Members of the House of Windsor in residence in Canada
 Prince Harry, Duke of Sussex, member of the House of Windsor
 Meghan, Duchess of Sussex, wife of Prince Harry
 Princess Alice, Countess of Athlone, member of the House of Windsor, was wife of a Canadian Governor General.
 Alexander Cambridge, 1st Earl of Athlone, Governor General of Canada, husband to Princess Alice.
 Prince Arthur, Duke of Connaught and Strathearn, Governor General of Canada, member of the House of Windsor.
 Princess Louise Margaret of Prussia, wife of Prince Arthur
 Princess Patricia of Connaught, daughter of Arthur and Louise Margaret

Canadians who married into the House of Windsor
 Autumn Phillips (born Autumn Kelly) married Peter Phillips, son of Princess Anne

Members of the House of Windsor born in Canada

Members of the House of Windsor who married Canadians
 Peter Phillips, married Autumn Kelly of Montreal

Members of the House of Windsor born to Canadians
 Savannah Phillips, born to Autumn and Peter
 Isla Phillips, born to Autumn and Peter

Members of the House of Windsor who became naturalized Canadians

Members of the House of Windsor who are otherwise Canadian

Canadians romantically associated with the House of Windsor
Several Canadians have had very serious relationships just short of marriage, and could have entered into the House of Windsor
 John Turner of Montreal, Prime Minister of Canada; was mooted to become husband to Princess Margaret, though politically problematical due to his Catholicism, would need her to renounce her claim to the throne.

Canadians who married into royalty

Royalty who were born in Canada

 Princess Margriet of the Netherlands, was born in Ottawa during the House of Orange's exile in World War II. By some measures, she was the first royal baby born in North America.
 Prince Hermann Friedrich of Leiningen (usually: Hermann Leiningen), at the time of his birth, was 50th in line to the British throne; is the grandson of the King of Bulgaria; was born in Toronto.

Royalty who married Canadians

Royalty born to Canadians

Royalty who became naturalized Canadians

Royalty who were otherwise born Canadian

Royalty in long term residence in Canada

 Queen Juliana of the Netherlands, spent WWII, as the Princess, in exile in Ottawa.
 Queen Beatrix of the Netherlands, aka Trixie Orange, spent World War II, as Princess, in exile in Ottawa.
 Princess Irene of the Netherlands, spent WWII in exile in Ottawa.
 Prince Edward, Duke of Kent and Strathearn, lived in the Canadas and Nova Scotia from 1791 to 1800. From 1794 to 1802, he held the position as the Commander-in-Chief of the Maritimes.

Royalty by reputation

Political royalty
 Trudeau family
 Mulroney family

Monied royalty
 Bronfman family of Seagrams
 Desmarais family of Power Corp.
 Irving family of the Irving Group
 McCain family of McCain Foods
 Peladeau family of Quebecor
 Thomson family of Reuters
 Weston family of Weston Foods

Celebrity royalty
 Celine Dion, the Queen of Pop.

Notes

  Rachel Meghan Markle Mountbatten-Windsor; Meghan, Princess Henry of Wales, Duchess of Sussex 
  Henry Charles Albert David Mountbatten-Windsor; His Royal Highness, Prince Henry of Wales, Duke of Sussex, of the House of Windsor 
  The Duke and Duchess of Sussex stepped back from royal duties, stopped actively using their HRH stylings and ceased to be representatives of the monarchy, as a result of their decision to become financially independent and move to North America.

References

See also
 Canadian peers and baronets
 Monarchist League of Canada (Canadian royalists)

Lists of Canadian people